Brisbane Live is a proposed, multipurpose entertainment and sporting arena to be located above Roma Street railway station in the central business district of Brisbane, Queensland, Australia. The project is being developed in conjunction with Cross River Rail. The venue will be the location for swimming events at the 2032 Summer Olympics.

The venue is expected to have a capacity of 17,000 to 18,000 people and cost $2.1 billion to construct.

Location
The arena will be located in a new precinct situated above existing railway lines directly east of Roma Street railway station. The arena precinct will be situated between Roma Street and Albert Street, linking with the railway station and Roma Street Parkland to the west. The site was partially occupied by the now demolished Brisbane Transit Centre.

See also

List of sports venues in Australia
Venues of the 2032 Summer Olympics and Paralympics

References

Brisbane central business district
Sports venues in Brisbane
Venues of the 2032 Summer Olympics and Paralympics
Roma Street, Brisbane
Proposed indoor arenas
Proposed sports venues in Australia
Indoor arenas in Australia
Swimming venues in Australia
Water polo venues in Australia
Olympic swimming venues
Olympic water polo venues